Pandoravirus tropicalis is a virus belonging to the genus Pandoravirus. It was isolated from water samples taken from the artificial lake Lake Pampulha in Brazil.

References 

DNA viruses